Bank of New Zealand (BNZ) is one of New Zealand's big four banks and has been operating in the country since the first office was opened in Auckland in October 1861 followed shortly after by the first branch in Dunedin in December 1861. The bank operates a variety of financial services covering retail, business and institutional banking and employs over 5,000 people in New Zealand. In 1992 the bank was purchased by the National Australia Bank and has since then operated as a subsidiary, but it retains local governance with a New Zealand board of directors.

As of June 2022, BNZ is the second largest bank operating in New Zealand, with a market share of 19.1%.

History

 1861: The Bank of New Zealand formed as a private company and incorporated by The New Zealand Bank Act 1861 creating the company and authorising it to issue banknotes. First branch in New Zealand opened in Queen Street in Auckland and a Dunedin branch is opened shortly afterward.
 1862: Wellington, Christchurch and London branches opened. Gained the banking account of the New Zealand Government from the Union Bank of Australia and became an agent to raise debt in the United Kingdom for the Government.

In the 1860s and 1870s capital was brought into New Zealand by the government and others. There was plenty of employment, development moved quickly and very good prospects brought property prices to high values. 
In the 1880s prices of staple products fell very low, the rabbit pest cut wool production and the government cut expenditure on public works by 75 per cent. Land fell to half its former value and was impossible to realise, many runholders and businessmen were ruined and the working classes were unable to purchase goods or pay their debts. There was no dairying or frozen meat industry.

Investors withdrew their capital. The export of frozen meat began in the 1880s refer Canterbury Lamb and dairy products soon followed see Anchor butter.
 1894: The BNZ saved by Government legislation in June.
 1895: The BNZ takes over the Colonial Bank of New Zealand which was in crisis.
 1940: £1 million interest free loan as a war contribution to the Government. The 74 women in the company rise to more than 700 by 1945.
 1943: Mobile branch opened in a caravan for American servicemen, Night banking introduced in Auckland and Wellington.
 1944: Personal loans department opened. Government announces intention to nationalise the bank.
 1945: Nash Government introduces the Bank of New Zealand Bill. Once passed the Government paid £7,933,000 in cash, transferable stock, and tax-free stock to the Bank's 8,500 shareholders for their shares. The average holding was 495 shares.
 1966: First computer purchased an IBM 360/30 with a 16k memory; Databank Systems Ltd setup in 1967 with the National Bank of New Zealand; the other three trading banks join in 1968.
 1978: Visa debit card introduced.
 1980: Visa credit cards introduced.
 1984: BNZ Centre completed on Willis Street, Wellington.
 1985: Eftpos introduced through petrol stations in a pilot programme.
 1987: Bank floated on sharemarket with a 15% stock offering.
 1989: Government reduces its share to 51% by selling 34%; with 30% sold to Capital Markets Ltd, and the remainder to the general public
 1990: Government bail out of $380 million to avoid collapse. Bolger was told on the Sunday after the 1990 election that the bank has to report by Friday, and if its not given support by then, it will collapse (because of Australian loans). It held 40 percent of the commercial paper in New Zealand. So if it collapsed, half of New Zealand's companies would have collapsed.

 1992: National Australia Bank (NAB) purchased the BNZ and the BNZ becomes a subsidiary of the Australian bank.
 1992: First call centre opened in Auckland.
 1998: Head office moves to Auckland.
 1999: BNZ launched Internet Banking.
 1999: BNZ Private Banking network launched.
 2000: 192 branches, 5562 staff.
 2008: 1 October: The bank rebrands itself as 'BNZ' with a change in logo and colours.
 2020: BNZ announces the closure of 38 branches over the next seven months as a result of the economic effects of COVID-19.

Core business functions

Retail banking
For retail customers, Bank of New Zealand offers a range of products and services that include savings and investments, home loans, credit cards, personal loans, insurance and international and migrant banking. Customers are able to bank using telephone banking, internet banking or by visiting one of 180 branches around New Zealand.

Business
Business banking at Bank of New Zealand has been branded BNZ Partners and provides a full range of banking services for small, medium and large businesses.
Services include transactional bank accounts, investments, loans and finance, card and payment, insurance and international banking services for businesses dealing with exports, imports and foreign exchange.
Bank of New Zealand’s business banking division provides banking staff with specialist knowledge of various industry sectors consisting of agribusiness, medical, professional, property, not-for-profit, franchising and iwi.

Institutional
Bank of New Zealand’s institutional banking division provides wholesale banking services for large corporate, financial institutions and government entities. These cover a wide range of sectors, including primary industries; manufacturing and retailing; energy; utilities; telecommunications and infrastructure; property; local government; health; and education. 
In December 2010, BNZ was appointed as lead arranger for the newly formed Auckland Council’s $600 million syndicated bank loan facility. In June 2010, BNZ was awarded the contract to provide the Auckland Council with comprehensive transactional services and over-the counter services.

Operations
Main management and administration functions for Bank of New Zealand are located in Wellington and Auckland and the bank operates a nationwide network of 180 retail stores and business centres (branded as Partner Centres).

Sustainability
Bank of New Zealand became the first bank in New Zealand to become carbon neutral. The achievement was announced in September 2010 after a three-year initiative to reduce emissions through greater energy and vehicle efficiency, encouraging changed behaviour by employees at work and at home and through offsetting of unavoidable emissions by purchasing quality carbon credits. The most visible aspect of the initiative came through the construction of three brand new, energy efficient buildings to house the bulk of the company’s management and administration staff. Two of these building are located in the Auckland CBD, one at Quay Park and the other at 80 Queen Street. The third was the Harbour Quays complex on the Wellington waterfront, built in 2009 and demolished in 2019 after suffering damage in the 2016 Kaikōura earthquake. The Deloitte Centre at 80 Queen Street was tagged "the greenest building in the land" after it became the first building in New Zealand to receive three Five Green Stars awards. The BNZ Quay Park building was nominated for a BeST Design Award in 2008 for Offices and Workplace Environments.

Arms

References

External links

Bank of New Zealand
History; the 1894 Government bailout & 1895 takeover of Colonial Bank

 
Privately held companies of New Zealand
Companies based in Auckland
New Zealand subsidiaries of foreign companies
National Australia Bank
Banks established in 1861
New Zealand companies established in 1861